Te land, ter zee en in de lucht (On land, at sea and in the air) was the longest-running general amusement television show and game show of the Netherlands, originally broadcast by TROS.

The show was initially branded as Vlieg er eens uit - a pun on the two sayings "ga er eens uit" ("go on holiday") and "uitvliegen" ("leave the nest") - between 1973 and 1977. From 1978 onwards, the show started to expand, adding new competition elements and rotating between cities. Until its end in 2011, it was one of the most popular television productions on the public broadcaster.

History

1973-1977: Vlieg er eens uit
In April 1973, TROS, in collaboration with producer René Stokvis, launched a televised competition called Vlieg er eens uit. In this competition, participants were asked to try to break the world record in world's longest human flight. The competition's main prizes were a holiday and the possibility to get a pilot's license. The show was supposed to produce just one episode, recorded in Enkhuizen, which was to be aired on 22 June 1973 on Nederland 1, featuring people jumping of a six metres tall tower in the harbour of that town. The show failed in its objective completely, as all of the just fifteen contestants fell down in the water quite quickly with its winner noting a time of 1.82 seconds.

However, already during the first production, the TROS stated their interest to produce a second edition. The production company sold television rights for the show to Germany, Belgium and Switzerland in 1974, creating a possible audience of up to twenty million viewers. During the show's third edition, there was a preference for serious entrants, as opposed to people trying for fun.

In 1976, the show introduced a new show element in which participants had to walk on the water through harbour as quickly as possible. In 1977, fellow public broadcaster AVRO established "De badkuiprace" ("The bathtub race") as a third competition, which was shot in Hoorn as opposed to Enkhuizen.

1978-2008, 2011: Te land, ter zee en in de lucht
In 1978, the show was expanded and rebranded it to Te land, ter zee en in de lucht. As opposed to being an annual event, it was decided that the show would be recorded in different cities, introducing new show elements such as "Tobbedansen", "Fiets 'm d'r in" and "Achteruitrijden". In this form, the show focused less on technology and records, and more on general entertainment with prizes for the most well-crafted vehicles and most unlucky contestants alongside the most successful participant. Willem van Kooten, who had hosted the show under the alias of Joost den Draaijer, was succeeded by actor and comedian André van Duin. As a result of this transformation, creating opportunity for more people to participate, the programme stayed popular throughout the following decades with host Jack van Gelder becoming especially popular among the crowd and with an estimated 2 million viewers per episode in 1993.

In early 2009, TROS announced that it was cancelling Te land, ter zee en in de lucht due to time shortage in their broadcast schedules. In 2011, the series was revived for a new season, but was less popular than before. Its last episode scored less than one million viewers and the series was not renewed.

Reception

Initial critical response
Its first edition was heavily parodied by Dutch press, with several publications jokingly calling the show "Plons er eens in" ("Dive into it"), due to the competition's largely unsuccessful participants. It was quickly dubbed as "uncomplicated amusement".

Societal impact
In 1973, during the show's first edition, several thousand locals gathered around the harbour of Enkhuizen to watch the recording. A year later, the local government of Enkhuizen decided to close all schools on the recording day of the second edition as many students had played truant during the recording a year prior. In 1975, Leeuwarder Courant reported that the recording had attracted 25.000 visitors. During a recording of the show's most popular competition "Achteruitrijden" on Circuit Zandvoort, a total of 40.000 visitors were present, which led to safety concerns.

Accidents
In 1976, an entrant of the show broke his leg while trying to test out his self-made plane at home. During a recording in 1991, Te land, ter zee en in de lucht veteran contestant Johan Vlemmix forgot to let go of a rope on time, was launched into the air and fell down eight metres on the ice of the Vechtsebanen.

Personnel

Presenters and narrators

Gallery of show elements within Te land, ter zee en in de lucht

References

1973 Dutch television series debuts
Dutch game shows
1970s game shows
1980s game shows
1990s game shows
2000s game shows
2010s game shows
NPO 1 original programming